Iragai Pole (English: Like a feather) is a song from the 2010 Tamil feature film Naan Mahaan Alla, composed and performed by Yuvan Shankar Raja. The song, with lyrics by Yugabharathy, was released as part of the soundtrack album of the film on 24 July 2010. The song became one of the most popular songs in 2010.

Production
Before the release of the soundtrack, composer Yuvan Shankar Raja stated on Twitter that the song which he sang will remain as one of his favourite songs. He had been working for days and claimed the song to be a "killer" and went on to add that he does not remember himself "tripping on his own song". After seeing the entire film, he was said to have remixed and completely reworked that song, altering the orchestration inter alia, to match it with the visuals.

Reception
The song got very positive response was selected as the pick of the album by the majority of critics. Top10cinema.com reviewer said about the song: "A doubtless cherry-pick of this album as Yuvan pulls all his might in this spellbinding melody". Rediff.com reviewer Pavithra Srinivasan wrote: "There's a lot going for this song, particularly in the beginning and the end, which are infinitely the best parts. Possibly the pick of the collection." 600024.com reviewer rated it 4.5 out of 5 and wrote: "Yuvan has sung this number. That is more than enough for this song to be a hit song. Best pick of this lot." Indiaglitz.com reviewer wrote: "The beats in the background along with the chorus bytes complement the song, all throughout. The fillers are amazing with techno beats and hip-hop mixing." He also said: "And for Yuvan's fans, if you've had a favourite of Yuvan's song sung by himself then that would go to the second place, with "Irugai Pole" reaching pinnacle! Undoubtedly the pick of the album!"

The song was eventually listed in many Top 10 songs of the year and claimed as one of the most popular songs of the year.

Accolades

References 

2010 songs
Indian songs
Songs written for films
Songs with music by Yuvan Shankar Raja
Tamil-language songs
Tamil film songs